The Glasgow and South Western Railway (GSWR) 103 class is a class of two 0-6-0 steam locomotives designed in 1855. They were Patrick Stirling's first 0-6-0 design for the railway.

Development 
The two examples of this class were designed by Patrick Stirling for the GSWR and were built by R & W Hawthorn (Works Nos. 933-4) in 1855. They were numbered 103 and 104. The members of the class were fitted with a domed boilers and safety valves over the firebox.

Withdrawal 
The locomotives were withdrawn in 1871.

References 
 

103
Standard gauge steam locomotives of Great Britain
Railway locomotives introduced in 1855
0-6-0 locomotives